Rocky V: Music from and Inspired by the Motion Picture is the soundtrack album to the 1990 film Rocky V.

Overview
The album is a complete departure from the previous soundtracks in the Rocky film series because it doesn't consist mainly of classic Bill Conti songs or rock music, but is instead dominated by hip hop and new jack swing music. Although the classic Conti songs "Conquest", "Mickey", and "Gonna Fly Now" are used in the film, they are not featured on the soundtrack. In the trailer for the movie, there were songs by Vince DiCola from Rocky IV (1985) including "Training Montage" and "War" that were not present for the film nor the soundtrack. The only Bill Conti song on the soundtrack, "Can't Stop the Fire", is not used in the film but was later used on the album Rocky Balboa: The Best of Rocky, which was released to coincide with the release of Rocky Balboa in 2006. Only four of the eleven tracks on the soundtrack are used in the film: the film's theme, "Go for It (Heart and Fire)" by Joey B. Ellis, "Take You Back (Home Sweet Home)" by 7A3, "Keep It Up" by Snap!, and "The Measure of a Man" by Elton John.

Track listing

Chart positions

References

1990 soundtrack albums
1990s film soundtrack albums
Rocky (film series) soundtracks
Capitol Records soundtracks